Walnut Street School was a historic school building located in downtown Evansville, Indiana.  It was designed by the architecture firm Shopbell & Company and built in 1913. It was in the Prairie School style architecture. It has been demolished.

It was listed on the National Register of Historic Places in 1982 and delisted in 1987.

References

Former National Register of Historic Places in Indiana
School buildings on the National Register of Historic Places in Indiana
Prairie School architecture in Indiana
School buildings completed in 1913
Schools in Evansville, Indiana
National Register of Historic Places in Evansville, Indiana
1913 establishments in Indiana